Miss Internacional Italia or "Miss International Italy" is an Italian beauty pageant in Italy that selects the Italian representative for the Miss International pageant. The pageant was first organized in 2008 and it is unrelated to Miss Italy or Miss Universo Italia, although some delegates have crossed over from one format to the other throughout the years.

History
Italy started to compete in 1960 until 1992 with Nicole Cinquetti as the last representative. Between 1993 and 2007, Italy did not compete at the Miss International. Begin in 2008 with Luna Voce as the first winner in that year, Italy starts to compete again. Prior to create Miss International Italia pageant, the candidate picked from Miss Italy Runner-up.

Titleholders

Notes
1965: Faida Fagioli became the best representative ever in Miss International history from Italy with the highest placement in 2nd Runner-up.
2009: Miss International Italia pageant did not held anymore, due to lack sponsorships. 
2013: Luna Voce won the title of Miss Universo Italia 2013 and competed at the Miss Universe 2013 in Moscow, Russia.

See also
Miss Italy
Miss Universo Italia
Italy at major beauty pageants

References

External links
Official website

2008 establishments in Italy
Beauty pageants in Italy
Italy
Recurring events established in 2008
Italian awards